Club Deportivo Gallitos is a Puerto Rican soccer team which plays in Rio Piedras.  The team plays in the 2nd Division of the Puerto Rico Soccer League.  They also play in the Liga Nacional.

2008 season
The team finished the season with a record of 5-2-1.

Liga Nacional
In the team's first game they defeated San Juan United 4-0.

Current squad

References

Puerto Rico Soccer League 2nd Division
Football clubs in Puerto Rico
Liga Nacional de Fútbol de Puerto Rico teams